Atelophleps is a monotypic moth genus in the subfamily Arctiinae. Its single species, Atelophleps tridesma, is found in Australia. Both the genus and the species were first described by Turner in 1940.

References

Lithosiini
Monotypic moth genera
Moths of Australia